Avoca is a suburb of Bundaberg in the Bundaberg Region, Queensland, Australia.

Geography 
Avoca is bordered by the Burnett River to the north and west, and the suburb of Millbank and Isis Highway to the east. Avoca is a mostly residential area, with some crops and light industry closer to the river.

History 
Avoca State School opened its doors 29 January 1980.

Education 
Avoca State School is a government primary (Prep-6) school for boys and girls at Twyford Street. In 2017, the school had an enrolment of 363 students with 33 teachers (26 full-time equivalent) and 16 non-teaching staff (11 full-time equivalent). It includes a special education program.

There is no secondary school in Avoca. The nearest secondary school is in Bundaberg South.

References

External links
 

Suburbs of Bundaberg